Mark Leslie (born 1969) is a Canadian author of horror and speculative fiction.  He is the author of the short story collection One Hand Screaming (2004), a collection of short stories and poetry, mostly in the horror genre, the horror novel I, Death, (2014) the thriller Evasion (2014) and the editor of the science fiction anthology North of Infinity II (2006) and horror anthology Campus Chills (2009). Leslie is also the author of Haunted Hamilton: The Ghosts of Dundurn Castle & Other Steeltown Shivers (2012), Spooky Sudbury: True Tales of the Eerie & Unexplained (2013)(co-authored with Jenny Jelen) and Tomes of Terror: Haunted Bookstores and Libraries (2014)

Leslie, whose full name is Mark Leslie Lefebvre, jokes that he decided to write under the name Mark Leslie because it would be easier for people to spell and pronounce. Because he has been known in the book industry as Mark Lefebvre (former President of the Canadian Booksellers Association and Director of Self-Publishing and Author Relations for Rakuten Kobo, Inc) he released both his podcast and a series of books about writing, bookselling, and publishing, under his full name.

In 2021, Leslie won the 2021 Kobo Writing Life Indie Cover Contest for Fear and Longing in Los Angeles, which was designed by Juan Padron. In a 2021 interview, Leslie shared that the novel includes a special cameo appearance by Alicia Witt, whose music, empathy, and kindness to the novel's main character, Michael Andrews, helps him reach a pivotal moment in his life. Because Witt is an indie musician and owns access to most of her recorded work, she allowed Leslie use of the song lyrics in the book, as well as audio clips from her songs Already Gone, and Friend in the audiobook version of the novel.

Born and raised in Onaping Falls, Leslie lived in Hamilton, Ontario for twenty years, then moved to Waterloo, Ontario in January 2018.

Books

Fiction
 One Hand Screaming (2004, Stark Publishing)
 North of Infinity II (Editor) (2006, Mosaic Press)
 Campus Chills (Editor) (2009, Stark Publishing)
 Tesseracts Sixteen: Parnassus Unbound (Editor) (2012, Edge Science Fiction & Fantasy Publishing)
 I, Death (2014, Atomic Fez), (2016, Edge Science Fiction & Fantasy Publishing)
 Evasion (2015, Stark Publishing)
 Fiction River: Editor's Choice (Editor) (2017, WMG Publishing)
 Fiction River: Feel the Fear (Editor) (2017, WMG Publishing)
Active Reader: And Other Cautionary Tales from the Book World (2018, Stark Publishing)
Bumps in the Night: Creepy Campfire Tales (2018, Stark Publishing)
Fiction River: Feel the Love (Editor) (2019, WMG Publishing)
Fiction River: Superstitious (Editor) (2019, WMG Publishing)
Snowman Shivers: Two Short Humor Tales About Snowmen (2019, Stark Publishing)

Fiction Series: Canadian Werewolf 
 Book 0.5 - This Time Around: A Canadian Werewolf Short Story (2020, Stark Publishing)
 Book 1 - A Canadian Werewolf in New York (2017 & 2020, Stark Publishing)
 Book 2 - Stowe Away (2020, Stark Publishing)
 Book 3 - Fear and Longing in Los Angeles (2021, Stark Publishing)
 Book 4 - Fright Nights, Big City (2021, Stark Publishing)
 Book 5 - Lover's Moon [co-authored with Julie Strauss] (2022, Stark Publishing)
 Book 6 - Hex and the City (2023, Stark Publishing)

Non-Fiction
 Haunted Hamilton: The Ghosts of Dundurn Castle & Other Steeltown Shivers (2012, Dundurn)
 Spooky Sudbury: True Tales of the Eerie & Unexplained (co-author Jenny Jelen) (2013, Dundurn)
 Tomes of Terror: Haunted Bookstores & Libraries (2014, Dundurn)
 Creepy Capital: Ghost Stories of Ottawa and the National Capital Region (2016, Dundurn)
 Haunted Hospitals: Eerie Tales About Hospitals, Sanatoriums, and Other Institutions (co-author Rhonda Parrish) (2017, Dundurn)
 Macabre Montreal: Ghostly Tales, Ghastly Events, and Gruesome True Stories (co-author Shayna Krishnasamy) (2018, Dundurn)

Non-Fiction under Mark Leslie Lefebvre 

The 7 P's of Publishing Success (2018, Stark Publishing)
Killing It on Kobo (2018, Stark Publishing)
An Author's Guide to Working with Libraries and Bookstores (2019, Stark Publishing)
Wide for the Win (2021, Stark Publishing)
The Relaxed Author [co-authored with Joanna Penn] (2021, Curl Up Press)
Publishing Pitfalls for Authors (2021, Stark Publishing)
Accounting for Authors [co-authored with D.F. Hart, MBA] (2022, Stark Publishing)

Awards
 Fear and Longing in Los Angeles won the 2021 KWL (Kobo Writing Life) Best Indie Book Cover 2021 Award. The cover was created by designer Juan Padron. 
 Short story "Erratic Cycles" (Parsec Magazine Winter 1998-1999) was nominated in category of Best short-form work in English 2000
 Haunted Hamilton was short-listed in Non-Fiction for the Hamilton Arts Council Literary Awards 2013

Notes

External links

Canadian SF Works Database
 Dundurn Publishing Author page for Mark Leslie

1969 births
Living people
Canadian horror writers
Writers from Greater Sudbury
Writers from Hamilton, Ontario
Canadian male novelists
21st-century Canadian novelists
Canadian non-fiction writers
21st-century Canadian male writers
Canadian male non-fiction writers